Jane Wallace may refer to:

Jane Wallace (journalist), American journalist
Jane Wallace (novelist), British novelist

See also
Jane Wallis (disambiguation)